Yeylaq Rural District may refer to:
 Yeylaq Rural District (Kaleybar County), East Azerbaijan province
 Yeylaq Rural District (Isfahan Province)